(This sea knows too much) Takilleitor  is a 1998 Chilean film directed by Daniel de la Vega and starring Luis Dimas.

It took four years for the film to be produced and filmed due to financial problems. TVN joined the production after paying $15,000. The same television channel aired it in 1998, setting low ratings.

Critics rate the film as "the worst fiction in Chilean cinema". Through the years, it was transformed into a "cult film".

Plot 
The film shows a successful Luis Dimas and his driver, known as Takilleitor, driving through the streets of the country. Along with them are two former agents of the National Intelligence Center (CNI), who are chasing a "wooden parrot" that contains a "political message". Amidst a series of strange events, the singer constantly appears performing some of the songs that made him famous during the era of the New Wave.

Cast 
 Luis Dimas
 Rodrigo Vidal
 Shlomit Baytelman
 Sergio Hernández
 Patricia Rivadeneira
 Elvira López
 Alejandra Fosalba
 Andrea Lamarca
 Luly Streeter
 Carolina Gallegos
 Pablo Striano
 Valeria Chignoli
 Mauricio Aravena
 Cristian Droguett
 Melanie Jösch
 Francisco Chat
 Ingrid Isensee

References

External links 
 
 

1990s Spanish-language films
1998 films
1990s science fiction films
Chilean science fiction films
1998 comedy films
1998 science fiction films